Luis Ernesto Hinojosa Compres (born 1 November 1986), is a professional boxer from the Dominican Republic. He has held the WBA Fedecaribe flyweight and the WBA Fedelatin bantamweight titles.

Professional career

World title fight
Hinojosa lost to Yonfrez Parejo for the World Boxing Association bantamweight interim world title.

Other notable opponents
Hinojosa had a no contest against world title challenger Jonathan Guzmán due to an accidental headbutt.

He also has a loss to world title challenger Claudio Marrero.

He also has a loss to vacant WBA NABA USA title challenger kazakh Mussa Tursyngaliyev in March, 2018 in Florida.

References

External links

1986 births
Living people
Dominican Republic male boxers
Flyweight boxers
Bantamweight boxers
Featherweight boxers
Sportspeople from Santo Domingo